Echoes is an album by American jazz group the Modern Jazz Quartet featuring performances recorded in 1984 and released on the Pablo label.

Reception
The Allmusic review stated "The MJQ's return was one of the happiest events in jazz of the 1980s".

Track listing
All compositions by John Lewis except as indicated
 "That Slavic Smile" - 8:00   
 "Echoes" (Milt Jackson) - 7:08   
 "The Watergate Blues" (Percy Heath) - 6:04   
 "The Hornpipe" - 8:16   
 "Connie's Blues" (Milt Jackson) - 7:29   
 "Sacha's March" - 7:54

Personnel
Milt Jackson - vibraphone
John Lewis - piano
Percy Heath - bass
Connie Kay - drums

References

Pablo Records albums
Modern Jazz Quartet albums
1984 albums